Breslin and Hamill: Deadline Artists is a 2018 HBO documentary about Jimmy Breslin and Pete Hamill, "two of the most celebrated newspapermen of the 20th century" who worked in New York City covering events of the late 20th century. The film was directed by John Block, Jonathan Alter, and Steve McCarthy.

Summary 
The documentary traces the careers of Breslin and Hamill as reporters and columnists in New York City from the Kennedy assassinations to the 9/11 attacks. Breslin and Hamill worked for the New York Daily News and the New York Post, respectively, as well as for other newspapers among them as the Village Voice. Both came from an Irish Catholic working-class background,  neither of them finished college. They worked as "shoe-leather" reporters chasing stories. The documentary examines their way of reporting, their writing styles, their advocacy for the poor, the underdog, and the "working man", the impact of their columns, but also faults, an example being Breslin's put-down of a female Asian-born journalist. Both became celebrities in their days; Breslin ran for City Council President and starred in beer commercials while Hamill dated Jackie Onassis and Shirley MacLaine.

Production 
The film was started in 2015 after Alter and McCarthy invited filmmaker Block to join in the project. HBO underwrote the film with Nancy Abraham as the Executive Producer. Breslin and Hamill were interviewed several times for the movie by the producers starting in 2015. Aside from their interviews, over 40 people who knew them were interviewed, among them  Tom Brokaw, Gail Collins, Robert De Niro, Spike Lee, Les Payne, Nick Pileggi, Colin Quinn, Gloria Steinem, Gay Talese, Garry Trudeau, Tom Wolfe, and Ronnie Eldridge (Breslin's second wife). Like Breslin, Tom Wolfe and Les Payne died before the film was completed.

Archived material was used for local events and subjects like Bernhard Goetz, Son of Sam, Central Park Five, and the Crown Heights riot and national events including the Kennedy assassinations, the civil rights movement, the Vietnam war, and the 9/11 attacks. Michael Rispoli gave his voice to columns written by Breslin while Hamill read his own writing.

The world premiere took place in Manhattan on November 15, 2018; it was the closing night film at the Doc NYC Film Festival. An HBO premiere occurred on January 22, 2019, with a second showing in Washington, D.C. three days later. The documentary was first aired on HBO on January 28, 2019.

Reception 

Stephanie Zacharek from Time magazine describes the film to be "a lively and sly documentary" and was fond of the interviews with Breslin and Hamill.
Rick Kogan describes the film as "a feast of interviews, vintage footage, stories you'll remember and people you won't soon forget ... not a lament but a celebration of the way things used to be." He finds the film to be "bracingly romantic without being sickly nostalgic."

Meredith Blake indicates that the film "harks back to a more raucous period in journalism, when newsrooms were loud and so were the men — it was mostly men — who led them ...(b)efore the news business was the elite, white-collar bastion it has, by some accounts, become." Sophie Gilbert finds that the directors are "convincing in their argument that Breslin and Hamill shaped the way news stories are told, inspiring a generation to try to emulate their melding of dogged reporting and writerly craft" but describes it also as a "swooningly nostalgic portrait" of a time that in its masculinity may have kept "a generation of talented reporters on the margins".

Awards
The film received the 2020 Emmy Award for Outstanding Historical Documentary.

References

External links 
 

2018 films
HBO documentary films
Documentary films about New York City
Films about journalism
Films about journalists
2018 documentary films
2010s English-language films
2010s American films